Arne Desler (1894 — 1979), was a Danish chess player.

Biography
From the 1920s to the 1940s, Arne Desler was one of Danish leading chess players. From 1925 to 1943 he participated many times in the finals of Danish Chess Championships. In 1928, in simultaneous exhibition he defeated the ex-world Chess Champion José Raúl Capablanca.

Arne Desler played for Denmark in the Chess Olympiad:
 In 1930, at third board in the 3rd Chess Olympiad in Hamburg (+2, =8, -6).

References

External links

Arne Desler chess games at 365chess.com

1894 births
1979 deaths
Danish chess players
Chess Olympiad competitors
20th-century chess players